DNT may refer to:

Science, technology and medicine

Chemistry 
 Dermonecrotic toxin, a toxin
 Dinitrotoluene, a chemical precursor to TNT

Medicine 
 Double-negative T cell, a thymocyte in an early stage of development
 Dysembryoplastic neuroepithelial tumour, a type of brain tumour

Computing 
 Do Not Track, a proposed HTTP header, to disable tracking by web services

Places
 Dallas North Tollway, Texas, USA
 Dent railway station, by National Rail station code

Other uses
 Denotified tribes of India
 Norwegian Trekking Association (Norwegian: Den Norske Turistforening)
 Duluth News Tribune, a newspaper in Duluth, Minnesota, USA
 Druk Nyamrup Tshogpa, a political party in Bhutan

See also
 Trinitrotoluene (TNT), an explosive chemical compound